Turandot (minor planet designation: 530 Turandot) is a minor planet orbiting the Sun that was discovered by German astronomer Max Wolf on 11 April 1904 and named for the title character in a play by Carlo Gozzi that was to become best known as an opera Turandot by Puccini.

Photometric observations of this asteroid in 1986 gave a light curve with a period of 10.77 ± 0.03 hours and a brightness variation of 0.13 ± 0.02 in magnitude. The curve is asymmetrical with dual maxima and minima. This object has a spectrum that matches an F-type classification.

References

External links 
 
 

000530
Discoveries by Max Wolf
Named minor planets
000530
19040411